The Grammy Award for Best Country Performance by a Duo or Group with Vocal was awarded from 1970 to 2011.  The award has had several minor name changes:
 In 1970 the award was known as Best Country Performance by a Duo or Group
 From 1971 to 1981 it was awarded as Best Country Vocal Performance by a Duo or Group
 From 1982 to 2011 it was awarded as Best Country Performance by a Duo or Group with Vocal

The award was discontinued after the 2011 Grammy Awards in a major overhaul of Grammy categories. Since 2012, all duo or group performances in the country category were shifted to the newly formed Best Country Duo/Group Performance category.

Years reflect the year in which the Grammy Awards were presented, for works released in the previous year.

Multiple winners
Both Dixie Chicks and The Judds won five awards in the category. Other multiple winners include Alison Krauss and Union Station, and Emmylou Harris who won three apiece, and Asleep at the Wheel, Brooks and Dunn, Alabama, Rita Coolidge & Kris Kristofferson and Lady Antebellum each of which won two.

Recipients

Artists with multiple wins

5 wins
Dixie Chicks
The Judds

3 wins
Emmylou Harris 

2 wins
Alabama
Alison Krauss & Union Station
Brooks & Dunn
Lady Antebellum
Kris Kristofferson and Rita Coolidge

Artists with multiple nominations

12 nominations 
Alabama
Brooks & Dunn 

9 nominations 
Diamond Rio

7 nominations 
The Judds

6 nominations 
Dixie Chicks
Willie Nelson

5 nominations 
Emmylou Harris
Waylon Jennings
The Mavericks
The Oak Ridge Boys
Restless Heart

4 nominations 
 Larry Gatlin & the Gatlin Brothers Band
Lonestar
Rascal Flatts

3 nominations 
Asleep at the Wheel
Forester Sisters
Kris Kristofferson
Kenny Rogers

 

2 nominations 
Big & Rich
BR5-49
Charlie Daniels Band
Johnny Cash
Lady Antebellum
Little Big Town
Little Texas
The Kentucky Headhunters
Dolly Parton
Shenandoah
The SteelDrivers
Sugarland
Texas Tornados
The Tractors
Dottie West
Zac Brown Band

References

Grammy Awards for country music